The Victoria Handicap is a Melbourne Racing Club Group 3 Thoroughbred open handicap horse race, over a distance of 1400 metres, held annually at Caulfield Racecourse in Melbourne, Australia.  The total prize money for the race is A$200,000. The race is traditionally held on Easter Saturday.

History

Name

In 2020 the event was raced as the Elvis Thurgood 40th Anniversary Cup in honor of former jockey Ricky Elvis Thurgood who suffered career ending injuries in 1980.

Grade

 1949–1978 - Principal Race
 1979 - Listed Race
 1980 onwards - Group 3

Distance

 1949–1972 - 7 furlongs (~ 1400 metres)
 1973 onwards - 1400 metres

Winners

 2022 - Ayrton
 2021 - Mr Quickie
 2020 - Bam's On Fire
 2019 - Streets Of Avalon
 2018 - Widgee Turf
 2017 - Hooked
 2016 - Black Heart Bart
 2015 - Watermans Bay
 2014 - Sistine Demon
 2013 - Budriguez
 2012 - Smokin' Joey
 2011 - Red Colossus
 2010 - Orbit Express
 2009 - Masked Assassin
 2008 - Gotta Have Heart
 2007 - Stickpin
 2006 - Volitant
 2005 - Roman Arch
 2004 - Regal Roller
 2003 - Debrief
 2002 - Debrief
 2001 - Keeper
 2000 - Go Flash Go
 1999 - El Mirada
 1998 - Rustic Dream
 1997 - Lord Luskin
 1996 - Country Lane
 1995 - Simple As That
 1994 - Mister Elegant
 1993 - Surtee
 1992 - The Fount
 1991 - Solemn Oath
 1990 - Prince Ormenium
 1989 - Aisle
 1988 - Jet Fighter
 1987 - Jet Fighter
 1986 - Aiming
 1985 - Mendeara Etoile
 1984 - Kalimna Queen
 1983 - Hooplahannah
 1982 - Qubeau
 1981 - Aquatorial
 1980 - Schaparo
 1979 - Bit Of A Skite
 1978 - Money Talks
 1977 - Golden Fantasy
 1976 - Man-A-Million
 1975 - Kenmark
 1974 - Cut And Deal
 1973 - Nicopal
 1972 - †Abdul / Count Karl
 1971 - Romantic Son
 1970 - Tauto
 1969 - Abebe
 1968 - Ammate
 1967 - Snub
 1966 - Kaminyarr
 1965 - Samson
 1964 - Nicopolis
 1963 - Highmara
 1962 - Webster
 1961 - Fuss
 1960 - Correct
 1959 - Count Tassia
 1958 - Lord
 1957 - Parvo
 1956 - Brocken
 1955 - St. Joel
 1954 - Burdindi
 1953 - Pure Fire
 1952 - Joyance
 1951 - Savoy
 1950 - Star Port
 1949 - Ungar

† Dead heat

See also
 List of Australian Group races
 Group races

References

Horse races in Australia